The Arrowhead Line was a suburban route of the Pacific Electric Railway. It ran from the joint Pacific Electric and Southern Pacific San Bernardino Depot to Arrowhead Springs, by way of D Street.

History
Constructed by the San Bernardino, Arrowhead & Waterman Railway, the line was sold to the Pacific Electric in 1904. An extension to the Arrowhead Hotel began carrying cars in March 1907. Operations along the line ceased on July 7, 1924 amid power problems in Pacific Electric system; limited service was restored the following January with the rest of the line brought back to full schedule by March 25, 1925. The Arrowhead Line saw sparse passenger service beyond the local lines in San Bernardino, with many trips north of Highland Avenue operated as a shuttle service. The route was abandoned after August 1932. Excursion trips continued until June 1941. Local service was reestablished as far north as Mountain View and 34th as part of the D Street–Highland Avenue Local between 1937 and 1942, when the franchise expired.

Freight operations continued with diesel locomotives after 1942.

Freight
The Arrowhead Line primarily served to haul water tanks from the Arrowhead Springs Company.

References

External links
Arrowhead Line Map (1919) — via Barry Lawrence Ruderman Antique Maps Inc.

Pacific Electric routes
Light rail in California
Transportation in San Bernardino County, California
1902 establishments in California
Railway lines opened in 1902
Railway services discontinued in 1932
1942 disestablishments in California
San Bernardino Mountains
Closed railway lines in the United States